The New York Transit Museum (also called the NYC Transit Museum) is a museum that displays historical artifacts of the New York City Subway, bus, and commuter rail systems in the greater New York City metropolitan region. The main museum is located in the decommissioned Court Street subway station in Downtown Brooklyn and Brooklyn Heights in the New York City borough of Brooklyn. There is a smaller satellite Museum Annex in Grand Central Terminal in Midtown Manhattan. The museum is a self-supporting division of the Metropolitan Transportation Authority.


Historic use as station 

The museum is located in an actual subway station, which was originally called Court Street. The Court Street station was built as a terminus for local trains of the IND Fulton Street Line and opened on April 9, 1936, along with a long section of the Fulton Street Line and the Rutgers Street Tunnel. The station has one center island platform with two tracks. The tracks end at bumper blocks just beyond the west end of the platform. The station walls feature a tile band set in a course two tiles high (as is the case with most IND local stations), colored aquamarine with a cerulean blue border.

The station exemplified the IND service theory and the design of most of the Manhattan trunk lines, which specified that local trains should operate within individual boroughs where possible, and provide transfers to express trains which would be through-routed between the boroughs. Court Street was to be the northern terminal of the HH Fulton Street Local, which would run south (geographically east) to Euclid Avenue. Additionally, one of the alternative plans for the Second Avenue Subway would have included a southern extension to Brooklyn, tying into the stub at Court Street to accommodate through service to/from Manhattan.

The HH through service was never inaugurated; the only trains to serve the station were part of the Court Street Shuttle, taking passengers from Court Street to the transfer station at Hoyt–Schermerhorn Streets. Due to the proximity of other stations in the Downtown Brooklyn area, as well as the need to transfer to reach it, Court Street never saw much traffic and was abandoned on June 1, 1946. However, it is still a functioning subway station; trains are moved into and out of the exhibits using the tunnel between the station platforms and the outer tracks at Hoyt–Schermerhorn Street station (see below). Following the station's closure, most of the entrances to the street were sealed.

While the station was closed to the public, non-revenue trains would occasionally run to and from the station, with the purpose of "keeping the rails polished". On March 15, 1960, the New York City Transit Authority tested a new cleaning process on the walls of the Court Street station, which had been stained after years without use. Meanwhile, the sealed but still-present station entrances became dumping grounds for garbage.

The station was also used as a set for movies: three years after its closing in 1949, the station was used for the filming of the film Guilty Bystander. On November 26, 1956, the station was used to film a scene of The FBI Story, posing as the Bowling Green station. After the museum opened, the station continued to be used as a set for movies, most notably the 1974 film The Taking of Pelham One Two Three, and the entrance at Boerum Place and Schermerhorn Street was reopened for shoots. To this day, the station and its connecting tunnels are still used for movie shoots. The 2009 film The Taking of Pelham 123, a remake of the 1974 movie, was also filmed there. More recently, the museum appeared in the Life on Mars episode "The Simple Secret of the Note In Us All", where a newspaper columnist is found murdered on a subway car. The museum remains open to requests to use the station for filming, as well as to host private events during hours the facility is not normally open.

Station layout

The station was a two-track, one-island platformed station while in service. The Transit Museum's main entrance is located at the corner of Boerum Place and Schermerhorn Street in downtown Brooklyn.

An ADA-accessible chair lift and elevator were added after the station was converted into a museum. The wheelchair lift is located at Court and Schermerhorn Streets, but unlike the elevators in operational New York City Subway stations, must be accessed by requesting it in advance or using a call button.

Exhibits and programs
On July 4, 1976, the New York City Transit Exhibit was opened in the decommissioned underground station as part of the United States Bicentennial celebration, charging a fee of one subway token for admittance. Old subway cars which had been preserved, as well as models and other exhibits were displayed. Plans were to keep the museum open until September 7 of that year, but it proved to be so popular that it remained open and eventually became a permanent museum. On weekends during its initial opening, museum nostalgia trains would run between 57th Street − Sixth Avenue and Rockaway Park, making an intermittent hour-long stop at the exhibit.

In the mid-1990s the Metropolitan Transportation Authority (MTA) assumed control of the Transit Museum from the New York City Transit Authority. At that time, the scope of the museum was expanded to include other aspects of transportation services within the MTA region, including commuter rail (Metro-North, Staten Island Railway, Long Island Rail Road) and roads, tunnels, and bridges (MTA Bridges and Tunnels). Since then, rotating exhibits on the mezzanine level frequently highlight commuter railroad and bridge/tunnel operations, as well as their history.

The museum includes subway, bus, railway, bridge, and tunnel memorabilia; and other exhibits including vintage signage and in-vehicle advertisements; and models and dioramas of subway, bus, and other equipment. A program of lectures, seminars, films, and tours for all ages is offered at the museum. In addition, offsite programs consist of guided tours of MTA facilities, subway stations, artwork and architecture, and New York neighborhoods, as well as opportunities to ride vintage railway and bus equipment.

The museum's mezzanine (upper) level contains the majority of the exhibits, restrooms, water fountains, a gift shop, and a dining space for visitors who have brought their own food or drink (none is for sale onsite). Artifacts from historic subway and bus operations, as well as NYC transportation infrastructure, are on display. The exhibits on the upper level are changed from time to time. In addition, there is a small presentation screening room which usually displays posters and videos for public education about courtesy and safety, including examples from other transit systems around the world.

In addition to its own exhibit spaces, the museum occasionally collaborates with other local organizations, such as the Coney Island Museum, to jointly present historical or contemporary shows, such as Five Cents To Dreamland: A Trip to Coney Island.

Railway artifacts

On the platform (lower) level, two fully powered and operational subway tracks contain many historic examples of New York City subway and elevated railway equipment on permanent display. Preserved railcars, most of which can still be operated, date as far back as the predecessor companies that came before the New York City Transit Authority, such as the BMT and IRT private companies, and the city owned and operated IND. The platform bordering one of the two tracks is equipped with hinged bright yellow gap filler boards, to allow the narrower IRT railcars to be safely boarded from a platform which was built for the wider cars running on newer lines.

A few specialized railwork vehicles formerly used for maintenance are also usually on view. In addition to the operational rolling stock, there is a large wheel truck and motor (bogie) on display on the platform itself, along with a series of informational panels showing the development of New York City's rail transit systems.

In addition, a fully functional underground "signal tower" control room is on view, a facility that was used to monitor the IND Fulton Street Line and IND Crosstown Line when the subway station was in active revenue service. The track diagram indicator lights and control levers are fully operational, and are still needed when the subway cars on display are replaced or moved; however, since the controls are live, the control panel is secured and locked, but visitors can still view it through a window and read explanatory signs.

Other artifacts in the museum include a poster for the 1926 lost film, Subway Sadie, as well as an original brass light fixture from the station's operating days. It also features an original mosaic plaque from the 137th Street station, dating back to the subway's 1904 opening.

Bus fleet and artifacts

Besides subway cars, the museum has a sizable vintage bus fleet of retired buses. Because there is no area available for their permanent exhibition in the underground museum, they are stored in various bus depots around the city. They are brought out for special events, such as the museum's annual "Bus Festival," which is held annually in conjunction with the Atlantic Antic street fair. The Bus Festival began as an annual tradition in 1994. During the Bus Festival, the museum opens its doors for free.

The bus fleet includes:
 #3100 (built 1956) was the first air-conditioned bus in use in any American transportation system. An experimental bus of the Fifth Avenue Coach Company, it had rear exit doors that passengers pushed to open; seats wrapping around the back of the bus; soft seats; and fluorescent lights. It last saw passenger service in the mid-1970s, having been used later for the New York City Transit Police.
 #236 (built 1980) was the first of the advanced design - high-tech bus for its age, having wheelchair-accessible lifts and electronic marquees. The fleet had many mechanical/structural problems and was pulled from service after four years.
 #2969 (originally #4789; built 1948) was custom-made for the city's transit system and was one of the first  buses. Its front door was twice as wide as other buses' front doors at the time. It was renumbered after the bus that Jackie Gleason's character in The Honeymooners, Ralph Kramden, was pictured in.
 #3865 (built 1993) was operated by Queens Surface Corporation during its first years of service, but in May 2000, the bus became under the operation of Jamaica Buses. Twelve of the former Queens Surface buses (including #3865) replaced some 1980s-era buses that Jamaica Buses operated.
 #100 (built 1959) was a "New Look" bus built by GMC. In total, 190 "New Look" buses operated in New York City. Each had a curved windshield with a one-piece overhead route sign and windows shaped like parallelograms.
 #621 (built 1979) was a "Fishbowl" bus built by General Motors of Canada and one of ten such buses used in New York City until the 1990s.
 #3006 (built 1988) was a "Classic" bus operated by Liberty Lines Transit and used from 1982 to 2006.
 #1502 (built 1982) was a "New Look" bus. The 25 buses were operated by New York Bus Service. These buses had seats that faced forward; overhead racks and lights; and one door at the front.
 #5227 (built 1971 and rebuilt 1985) was one of 350 "New Look" buses that were rebuilt in Chicago. The buses, which had hard, blue lengthwise seating, were the last NYCT buses without a wheelchair lift.
 #1201 (built 1981) was one of ultimately 4,877 Rapid Transit Series buses used by the MTA Regional Bus Operations companies from 1981 to 1999. These buses all had wheelchair lifts, making MTA the first agency in the United States to have a fully accessible bus fleet.
 #8928 (built 1969) was one of 133 buses that replaced an earlier, 1956 fleet. Thirteen buses were operated on Staten Island express buses and were later used as buses between John F. Kennedy International Airport and the JFK Express at Howard Beach–JFK Airport.

Some bus artifacts are present in the station. A revenue bag, one of many provided for use for bus drivers with the Third Avenue Transit Corporation, was used during the 1950s to transport money out of the buses. It is part of the interactive "Show Me the Money: From the Turnstile to the Bank" exhibit, where visitors could "see an image of the vacuum that attaches to the fare box and sucks the coins out."

Current exhibits
, the museum features a number of exhibits:
"Steel, Stone & Backbone: Building New York's Subways" highlights the challenges and labor involved in subway construction during the period 1900–1925.
"Moving the Millions" chronicles the history of the subway system from the private operators to the MTA New York City Transit of today. Located on the platform level, it is designed to supplement a visitor's experience exploring the various subway cars on display in the museum.
"Fare Collection" explains different methods New Yorkers have used to pay subway fare over the years, and displays authentic subway turnstiles which visitors can traverse. In addition, there is a small display of the various token designs that were used in the past before they were completely discontinued.
"On the Streets" exhibits a comprehensive history of New York City's street transportation (horsecars, cable cars, streetcars, buses, etc.), as well as two bus installations visitors can sit in, including the driver's seat.
"Clearing the Air" discusses modern street transportation and its impact on the environment, and highlights steps that the MTA is taking to reduce its carbon footprint.
"Stop Look and Listen" allows visitors to enter a working subway signal tower dating from 1936, to see how trains are kept a safe distance apart and supervised.
"Bringing Back The City: Mass Transit Responds To Crisis" explains planning and emergency services, and their role in preventing or recovering from service disruptions.
"No Spitting on the Platform" displays historic way-finding and etiquette signage.
"Dr. George T.F. Rahilly Trolley and Bus Study Center" displays over 50 scale models of streetcars and work cars, with a focus on Brooklyn.

Turnstiles and fare collection

Various turnstiles from the history of subways are on display at the New York Transit Museum. They date as far back as the subway's opening in 1904, up through turnstiles that were still in use as recently as 2003. The exhibit includes many different types of turnstiles, including turnstiles used during the 1939 New York World's Fair that were designed to require passengers to pay a special double fare both upon entering and exiting the World's Fair subway station. The exhibit is designed to be interactive and to be viewed in conjunction with a large board that details the history of fare payment in the subway. Most of the turnstiles can be walked through by visitors wishing to do so.

Rolling stock

Most of the subway cars in the Transit Museum's fleet are operable, and they are frequently used for subway excursions run by the museum and New York City Transit on various parts of the system. The subway cars are fully furnished with vintage advertising placards and route maps, completing the period atmosphere inside the vehicles. Tickets for Transit Museum excursions (called "Nostalgia Trains") are sold in advance. Some New York City Transit special trains (such as Holiday specials at the end of most years, and Yankee/Met specials) are available for anyone to ride, so long as they have paid the regular subway fare. In addition to the subway cars displayed in the Transit Museum, there are also a number of museum cars that are kept off-site in various subway yards and shops while awaiting restoration, undergoing restoration, or in storage.

The following cars are displayed in the museum :

Track A1:
R6 #1300
R4 #484
R7A #1575
R11 #8013
R42 #4572–4573 (used in the 1971 film The French Connection)
BRT AB Standard #2204
R30 #8506
R44 #5240
Track A2
BRT BU Gated El Cars #1404, 1273, 1407
R33S #9306, 9310
R12 #5760
R15 #6239
BMT Q-Type El Car #1612C
IRT Lo-V #4902
Long Island Rail Road Caboose #C-60
SBK Steeplecab #5
R3 Pump Car #56

There are many cars not on display, but rather, are used on special fan excursions and other events. Most are based at 207 Street or Coney Island Yard. The rolling stock not on display include:

SBK Steeplecab 6, 7
 Diesel Locomotive 10
IRT World's Fair Lo-V #5655
BMT D-Type Triplex #6019A-B-C, 6095A-B-C, 6112A-B-C
R1 #100
R10 #3189  (former Road Car Inspector School Training Car used at Pitkin Yard, 1984–2007)
R12 #5782  (former Fire Department Training Car used at Coney Island Yard)
R14 #5871  (former Fire Department Training Car used at Coney Island Yard)
R16 #6387
R17 #6609 (used in the 1971 film The French Connection)
R26 #7774–7775
R28 #7924–7925
R29 #8678–8679
R32 #3352–3353  (Rebuilt as Phase II)
R33 #9010–9011, 9016–9017, 9068–9069, 9206–9207 (part of the Train of Many Colors excursion cars)
R33S #9307–9308, 9343
R36 #9542–9543, 9586–9587
R38 #4028–4029
R40 #4280–4281
R40A #4480–4481
R95 Revenue Collection Cars #0R714 (former R21 #7194) and #1R714 (former R22 #7422)
"Money Train" Car #51050 (former R21 car #7203, modified and used in the 1995 film Money Train.)

Gallery

Past exhibits
Some exhibits no longer on view include:
"ElectriCity: Powering New York's Rails", an interactive exhibit of the various types of electric power generation, how it gets to the subway, and how electric motors work.
"Show Me the Money: From the Turnstile to the Bank", which explained the old (pre-2006) process of revenue collection in the New York City Subway via money trains, cloth "money bags", and a sewing machine used to create them.

No longer on view in the "Fare Collection" exhibit are several token vending machines that were used to sell subway tokens prior to the advent of the MetroCard.

Other previous exhibits have included surveys of historic subway maps, artwork, signage, and mosaics. A refrigerator-sized plug-in circuit breaker, a complete relay-based classic electric motor controller, and numerous other artifacts that highlight topics such as subway signaling and control, electrical power, and railway infrastructure are no longer on view at the platform (lower) level.

Grand Central Gallery Annex and Store

The New York Transit Museum Gallery Annex and Store opened on September 14, 1993 at Grand Central Terminal, in the terminal's main concourse. It houses a transit-oriented gift shop as well as a space for rotating temporary exhibitions. The Annex is the site of the Transit Museum's annual "Holiday Train Show", where an operating model train layout is displayed for the public. While there is an admission fee at the Transit Museum's main Brooklyn Heights location, entrance to the Annex is free. The main Brooklyn Heights location also has its own gift shop, which is accessible outside of the museum's paid area.

Archives
Documents, photographs, and artifacts are stored both in the Transit Museum and in the nearby Archives, adding to the goal of preserving the legacy of transportation in New York. Historians and researchers who wish to visit the Archives are able to do so through the museum. Some images from their collection can also be seen on Historypin.

See also
List of museums and cultural institutions in New York City

References

External links

Official websites
NY Transit Museum
Transit Museum Online Collections Database
Transit Museum's Online Store

Unofficial sites with official content
MTA's New York Transit Museum Facebook Web Page
Images from the MTA's New York Transit Museum Archive on Historypin

Unofficial sites
nycsubway.org
IND Fulton: Court Street (Future Transit Museum)
New York Transit Museum
Subway.com.ru
Op-Rail

Google Maps Street View tours
 Google Virtual Tour of the NYC Transit Museum
 Main entrance from Google Maps Street View
 ADA-accessible entrance from Google Maps Street View

1976 establishments in New York City
Association of Science-Technology Centers member institutions
Boerum Hill
Brooklyn Heights
Former elevated and subway stations in Brooklyn
History museums in New York City
IND Fulton Street Line stations
Museums established in 1976
Museums in Brooklyn
Museums in Manhattan
Railroad museums in New York (state)
Technology museums in New York (state)
Transportation museums in New York City
Grand Central Terminal